Miss International 2010, the 50th anniversary of the Miss International pageant, was held on November 7, 2010 at the Sichuan Province Gymnasium in Chengdu, China. Miss International 2009, Anagabriela Espinoza of Mexico crowned her successor, Elizabeth Mosquera of Venezuela, at the end of the event.

Seventy contestants competed for the title, the highest turnout in the history of Miss International at the time. The contestants arrived in Shanghai on October 20 and 21, traveled to Chengdu on October 22 and returned to Shanghai after the finals.

Results

Placements

Special awards

Contestants

Notes

Debuts

Returns

Last competed in 1989:
 
Last competed in 1995:
 
Last competed in 2000:
 
 
Last competed in 2005:
 
Last competed in 2006:
 
Last competed in 2007:
 
 
Last competed in 2008:

Withdrawals

References

External links
 Official website

2010
2010 in China
2010 beauty pageants
Beauty pageants in China
November 2010 events in China